Winter Camp Creek is a stream in Kingfisher and Canadian counties, Oklahoma, in the United States.

Winter Camp Creek was named for a Cheyenne and Arapaho settlement which stood near its banks. It was formerly called Dead Indian Creek.

See also
List of rivers of Oklahoma

References

Rivers of Canadian County, Oklahoma
Rivers of Kingfisher County, Oklahoma
Rivers of Oklahoma